Sax (locally: .  ) is a municipality in the comarca of Alt Vinalopó, province of Alicante, Valencian Community.

History
There are archaeological findings in the area dating to the Bronze Age, as well as an Iberian necropolis and remains of Roman villas.

In the later stages of the Reconquista, Sax was at the focus of tensions between Castile and Aragon, since James I of Aragon conquered it from the Moors though it should have been reserved to Castile under the treaties of Tudilén and Cazorla.

Notable people
 Alberto Sols García (1917–1989), biochemist, born in Sax

Main sights
Castle, one of three main fortress in the comarca together with those clnerthera  of Villena and Biar. The base of one of the towers is perhaps Roman, while the other is of Moorish origin (10th–12th century)
Church of the Assumption (16th century)
Casa Fnek, a modern art museum located in an abandoned house

See also 
Route of the Castles of Vinalopó

References

External links

Official website 
Comparsa de Alagoneses 
 El Castillo de Sax. Study Association. 
 tour of the castle

This article contains information from the Spanish Wikipedia article Sax, accessed on January 26, 2008.

Municipalities in the Province of Alicante